The 2002 Big Ten men's basketball tournament was the postseason men's basketball tournament for the Big Ten Conference and was played from March 7 through March 10, 2002 at Conseco Fieldhouse in Indianapolis, Indiana. The championship was won by Ohio State who defeated Iowa in the championship game. As a result, Ohio State received the Big Ten's automatic bid to the NCAA tournament.  

Due to NCAA sanctions, Ohio State was forced to vacate the championship.

Seeds

All Big Ten schools participated in the tournament. Teams were seeded by conference record, with a tiebreaker system used to seed teams with identical conference records. Seeding for the tournament was determined at the close of the regular conference season. The top five teams received a first round bye.

Bracket

Source

All-Tournament team 
 Boban Savovic, Ohio State – Big Ten tournament Most Outstanding Player
 Brian Cook, Illinois
 Luke Recker, Iowa
 Brian Brown, Ohio State
 Brent Darby, Ohio State

References

Big Ten men's basketball tournament
Tournament
Big Ten
Big Ten Conference men's basketball tournament
Big Ten men's basketball tournament